The 2007 FIU Golden Panthers football team represented Florida International University in the 2007 NCAA Division I FBS football season. The Golden Panthers were led by first-year head coach Mario Cristobal and played their home games at the Miami Orange Bowl while FIU Stadium, their normal home field, underwent expansion. Cristobal replaced FIU's first head coach, Don Strock, who resigned after an 0–12 2006 season marred by a brawl with the University of Miami.

Schedule

References

FIU
FIU Panthers football seasons
FIU Golden Panthers football